Aisulu Almaty are an ice hockey team in the European Women's Hockey League (EWHL). They play in Almaty, Kazakhstan, at the Baluan Sholak Sports Palace. The team participated in every holding of the IIHF European Women Champions Cup, from 2004 until its scheduled stoppage in 2015, winning bronze at the 2008 tournament. They have competed in the EWHL since the 2015–16 season and placed third in the league in 2016 and 2020.

Season-by-season record

References

External links
Aisulu Almaty at the EuroHockey.com
Aisulu Almaty at the HockeyTime.net

European Women's Hockey League teams
Ice hockey teams in Kazakhstan
Women's ice hockey teams in Asia